Libertad Fútbol Club is an Ecuadorian professional football club from the city of Loja. Founded on 17 May 2017, they play in the Serie A.

History
Founded on 17 May 2017 as Independiente Fútbol Club de Pindal, the club played in the Segunda Categoría de Loja in the 2018 season, In 2019, the club qualified to the national phase of the Segunda Categoría, being knocked out in the group stage.

Ahead of the 2020 campaign, Independiente changed name to Libertad Fútbol Club, winning the tournament in Loja but still being knocked out early in the Segunda Categoría. After a second consecutive title in Loja in 2021, Libertad achieved promotion to the Serie B as champions.

In the 2022 Serie B, their first-ever season in the second level, Libertad won an immediate promotion to the Serie A, finishing in the third place but benefitting from Independiente Juniors' ineligibility for promotion.

Achievements
Segunda Categoría
Winner (1): 2021

Players

Current squad

References

External links
 

Football clubs in Ecuador
Association football clubs established in 2017
2017 establishments in Ecuador